The National Geographic produced a documentary entitled Inside Guantanamo, first broadcast in early April 2009. It details the practices inside Guantanamo Bay military prison.

The Director, Jon Else, wrote: 

Neil Genzlinger, reporting for New York Times, wrote:

The film interviewed some key players who played a role in the controversial camp. 
Colonel Bruce Vargo called the camps: "an integral part of the war on terror."
Lieutenant Commander Charles Swift, the Navy lawyer assigned to defend Salim Ahmed Hamdan, said:
"Guantanamo Bay was the legal equivalent of outer space -- a place with no law."

References

Guantanamo Bay detention camp
2009 television films
2009 films
2009 documentary films